On 19-21 November 1977, President of Egypt Anwar Sadat visited Jerusalem. The purpose of the visit was to address the Knesset, the legislative body in Israel, to try to advance the Israeli-Arab peace process. Sadat met with senior Israeli officials, including Prime Minister Menachem Begin. It was the first visit of its kind by an Arab leader to Israel. At that time, the two countries were considered at war.

Background 
Sadat had stated before a special session of the Egyptian People's Assembly that he was ready to go to their "home", the Knesset in Jerusalem and discuss peace on 9 November 1977. Among those present was the leader of the Palestine Liberation Organization, Yasser Arafat. Sadat got a standing ovation, and the audience did not think that the president was serious about what he was saying. The Israelis responded and sent an official invitation to him through the American ambassador in Cairo.

The visit 
“You want to live with us in this part of the world,” Sadat declared. “In all sincerity, I tell you, we welcome you among us, with full security and safety.” During the speech, he also fervently rejected Israeli sovereignty over the Old City of Jerusalem. After visiting Al Aqsa Mosque, Sadat toured the Church of the Holy Sepulchre.

Aftermath 

Sadat's move was widely condemned by Arab leaders.

Talks continued in the Egyptian city of Ismailia, with American mediation. In March 1979, the two sides would reach a bilateral agreement at Camp David that culminated in a peace treaty. On 6 October 1981, while watching the annual parade that marked Egypt's initial success in the Yom Kippur War, Sadat was assassinated. Some claim that one of the motives for the murder was the peace agreement.

References 

1977 in Egypt
1977 in Israel
Egypt–Israel relations
Anwar Sadat
November 1977 events in Asia